Moon Madness is a 1920 American silent drama film directed by Colin Campbell and starring Edith Storey, Sam De Grasse, and Josef Swickard.

Cast
 Edith Storey as Valerie / Zora 
 Sam De Grasse as Adrien 
 Josef Swickard as Latour 
 Wallace MacDonald as Jan 
 Irene Hunt as Badoura 
 William Courtleigh as Raoul
 Frankie Lee as The Child 
 Fred Starr as Arab Chief

References

Bibliography
 Donald W. McCaffrey & Christopher P. Jacobs. Guide to the Silent Years of American Cinema. Greenwood Publishing, 1999.

External links

 

1920 films
1920 drama films
1920s English-language films
American silent feature films
Silent American drama films
American black-and-white films
Films directed by Colin Campbell
Film Booking Offices of America films
1920s American films